The R327 road is a regional road in Ireland connecting the N60 east of Claremorris, County Mayo, to the R360 in County Galway. 

The official description of the R327 from the Roads Act 1993 (Classification of Regional Roads) Order 2006  reads:

R327: Cuilmore, County Mayo - Pollremon, County Galway

Between its junction with N60 at Cuilmore in the county of Mayo and its junction with R360 at Pollremon in the county of Galway via Tulrohaun and Lugboy Cross in the county of Mayo: Culnacleha Bridge at the boundary between the county of Mayo and the county of Roscommon: Cloonfad in the county of Roscommon: and Kildaree in the county of Galway.

See also

List of roads of County Mayo
National primary road
National secondary road
Regional road
Roads in Ireland

References

Regional roads in the Republic of Ireland
Roads in County Mayo
Roads in County Galway
Roads in County Roscommon